Nemophora magnifica is a moth of the Adelidae family. It is found in Taiwan.

References

External links
Image

Adelidae
Moths described in 1997
Moths of Taiwan